Raj Bhavan, Jammu and Kashmir may refer to:

 Raj Bhavan, Jammu, official residence of the governor of Jammu and Kashmir, located in Jammu.
 Raj Bhavan, Srinagar, official residence of the governor of Jammu and Kashmir, located in Srinagar.